Esfidan (also Romanized as Esfīdān; also known as Esfīdān Māneh, Astīdān, Espīān, and Ispāīn) is a village in Atrak Rural District, Maneh District, Maneh and Samalqan County, North Khorasan Province, Iran. At the 2006 census, its population was 186, in 43 families.

References 

Populated places in Maneh and Samalqan County